The redtail emo skink (Emoia ruficauda) is a species of lizard in the family Scincidae. It is found in the Philippines and possibly Sulawesi.

References

Emoia
Reptiles described in 1915
Taxa named by Edward Harrison Taylor